Oskar Lafontaine (born 16 September 1943) is a German politician. He served as Minister-President of the state of Saarland from 1985 to 1998, and was federal leader of the Social Democratic Party (SPD) from 1995 to 1999. He was the lead candidate for the SPD in the 1990 German federal election, but lost by a wide margin. He served as Minister of Finance under Chancellor Gerhard Schröder after the SPD's victory in the 1998 federal election, but resigned from both the ministry and Bundestag less than six months later, positioning himself as a popular opponent of Schröder's policies in the tabloid press.

In the lead-up to the 2005 federal election, as a reaction to Schröder's Agenda 2010 reforms, Lafontaine co-founded the left-wing party Labour and Social Justice – The Electoral Alternative. Following a merger with the Party of Democratic Socialism in June 2007, he became co-chairman of The Left. He was the lead candidate for the Saarland branch of the party in the 2009 Saarland state election where it won over 20% of the vote. He announced his resignation from all federal political functions after being diagnosed with prostate cancer in 2009. He retained his position as a member of the Saarland legislature, and since May 2012 has been leader of the opposition in Saarland. Lafontaine resigned from the Left Party on 17 March 2022 because it was no longer an "alternative to the politics of social insecurity and inequality," he said.

Family and education
Lafontaine was born in Saarlautern (now Saarlouis) into a family of craftsmen. His father, Hans Lafontaine, was a professional baker and was killed serving in World War II. He spent his childhood living with his mother, Katharina (née Ferner), and his twin brother, Hans, in Dillingen.

He attended a Catholic episcopal boarding institution in Prüm and there was educated at the Regino-Gymnasium, a public school. He left school in 1962 and received a scholarship from Cusanuswerk, the scholarship body of the Catholic Church in Germany, to study physics at the universities of Bonn and Saarland. Lafontaine graduated in 1969; his thesis concerned the production of monocrystalline barium titanate. He worked for Versorgungs- und Verkehrsgesellschaft Saarbrücken until 1974, serving on its board from 1971.

Lafontaine has been married four times and has two sons by his second and third wives. Lafontaine was married to Ingrid Bachert from 1967 to 1982. From 1982 to 1988 he was married to the artist Margret Müller. Together they have a son (Frederic, born 1982). From 1993 to 2013 he was married to Christa Müller. They have a son together (Carl-Maurice, born 1997). In November 2011, Lafontaine officially presented fellow politician Sahra Wagenknecht as his new girlfriend, who is 26 years his junior. Since 22 December 2014 they have been married. He is a non-practising Catholic.

Political rise
Lafontaine rose to prominence locally as mayor of Saarbrücken and became more widely known as a critic of chancellor Helmut Schmidt's support for the NATO plan to deploy Pershing II missiles in Germany. From 1985 to 1998 he served as Minister-President of the Saarland. In this position he struggled to preserve the industrial base of the state, which was based on steel production and coal mining with subsidies, and served as President of the Bundesrat in 1992/93.

Chancellor candidacy and assassination attempt

Lafontaine was the SPD's candidate for Chancellor in the German federal election of 1990.  He faced nearly impossible odds.  The election had been called two months after the reunification of Germany, and the incumbent government of Helmut Kohl was in a nearly unassailable position.

During the campaign he was attacked with a knife by a mentally deranged woman after a speech in Cologne. His carotid artery was slashed and he remained in a critical condition for several days.

Political comeback
At the "Mannheim convention" in 1995, he was elected chairman of the SPD in a surprise move, replacing Rudolf Scharping. He was mainly responsible for bringing the whole political weight of the SPD to bear against Kohl and his CDU party, rejecting bipartisan cooperation that had characterized German politics for many years. Lafontaine argued that any help given to Kohl would only lengthen his unavoidable demise.

After the SPD's unexpectedly clear victory at the polls in September 1998, he was appointed Federal Minister of Finance in the first government of Gerhard Schröder.

Minister of Finance
During his short tenure as Minister of Finance, Lafontaine was a main bogeyman of UK Eurosceptics. This was because, among other things, he had called for the prompt tax harmonisation of the European Union, which would have resulted in an increase in UK taxes. In 1998, English tabloid "The Sun" called Lafontaine "Europe's most dangerous man". On 11 March 1999, he resigned from all his official and party offices, claiming that "lack of cooperation" in the cabinet had become unbearable. Until the formation of the Left Party he was known for his attacks against the Schröder government in the tabloid Bild-Zeitung, which is generally considered conservative.

Leaving the SPD and formation of The Left party
On 24 May 2005 Lafontaine left the SPD. After two weeks of speculation it was announced on 10 June that he would run as the lead candidate for The Left party (Die Linke), a coalition of the Labor and Social Justice Party (WASG), which was based in western Germany, and the Left Party.PDS, which was the successor to the ruling East German Socialist Unity Party (SED). Lafontaine joined the WASG on 18 June 2005 and was selected to head their list for the 2005 Federal Election in North Rhine-Westphalia on the same day. Moreover, he also unsuccessfully contested the Saarbrücken constituency, which he had previously represented from 1990 to 2002. Nevertheless, the result of the Left party in the Saarland was by far the best in any of the federal states in the West of Germany.

In 2007, when the Left Party was formed in a merger between 'Left Party.PDS' and WASG, he became chairman alongside Lothar Bisky.

In May 2009, he declared that "Financial capitalism has failed. We need to democratize the economy. The workforce needs to have a far greater say in their companies than has been the case so far."

In 2022, he published the book Ami, it's time to go where he criticizes NATO and American influence in German politics, arguing that Germany has become an American vassal state. The book became a bestseller.

Criticism
An article by Lafontaine on Erich Honecker, state and party leader of the German Democratic Republic and a fellow Saarlander, in the magazine Der Spiegel was criticised as laudatory by many observers. In the late 1980s and early 1990s, he tarnished his left-wing credentials with a plea for pro-business policies and a call for the reduction of the influx of Germans from Eastern Europe and asylum-seekers.

Lafontaine lives in a manor-like house, commonly known as the "palace of social justice" (Palast der sozialen Gerechtigkeit). When asked about whether this could be in conflict with his socialist ideas, Lafontaine said politicians of the left do not have to be poor, but they have to fight against poverty.

In a commentary published in the Frankfurter Allgemeine Zeitung, Lafontaine criticized the expansion of wind power, citing the alleged "destruction of the German Cultural landscape" as a cause for his objection. The Alliance 90/The Greens top candidate Barbara Meyer-Gluche pushed back at this stance and accused Lafontaine of "irrational fearmongering".

Literature 
 Hoell, Joachim: Oskar Lafontaine. Provokation und Politik. Eine Biografie. Dirk Verlag EK, Lehrach 2004, .
 Lorenz, Robert: Oskar Lafontaine. Portrait eines Rätselhaften. Monsenstein und Vannerdat, Münster 2013, .
 Lorenz, Robert: "Techniker der 'kalten Fusion'. Das Führungspersonal der Linkspartei". In: Tim Spier u.a. (Hrsg.): Die Linkspartei. Zeitgemäße Idee oder Bündnis ohne Zukunft? VS Verlag für Sozialwissenschaften, Wiesbaden 2007, S. 275–323.

Works 
 Das Lied vom Teilen. Die Debatte über Arbeit und politischen Neubeginn. Heyne, München 1989, .
 Keine Angst vor der Globalisierung. Wohlstand und Arbeit für alle. Dietz Verlag, Bonn 1998,  (zusammen mit Christa Müller).
 Das Herz schlägt links. Econ Verlag, München 1999, .
 Die Wut wächst. Politik braucht Prinzipien. Econ Verlag, München 2003, .
 Politik für alle. Streitschrift für eine gerechtere Gesellschaft. Econ Verlag, München 2005, .
 Ami, it's time to go! Plädoyer für die Selbstbehauptung Europas. Westend Verlag, Frankfurt 2022, .

References

External links

  www.die-linke.de – The German Left Party
  Oskar Lafontaine Information on the website of the parliamentary group Die Linke
 Will Germany Go Left of the Left? by Markus Deggerich, Der Spiegel, 25 September 2009

1943 births
Living people
People from Saarlouis
German Roman Catholics
German people of French descent
Presidents of the German Bundesrat
Labour and Social Justice – The Electoral Alternative politicians
The Left (Germany) politicians
Finance ministers of Germany
Members of the Bundestag for Saarland
Aufstehen
Ministers-President of Saarland
Members of the Landtag of Saarland
Anti-corporate activists
German anti-war activists
Leaders of political parties in Germany
German political candidates
Stabbing survivors
Members of the Bundestag 2009–2013
Members of the Bundestag 2005–2009
Members of the Bundestag 1998–2002
Members of the Bundestag 1994–1998
Members of the Bundestag for the Social Democratic Party of Germany